51 Minds Entertainment (or Fifty One Minds Entertainment) is a production company specializing in reality TV, known for their "celebreality" programs on VH1. It was created in 2004 as a merger between Cris Abrego's 51 Pictures (formerly Brass Ring Entertainment) and Mark Cronin's Mindless Entertainment. In 2005, the company signed a two-year, seven series production deal with VH1. The company has been credited in helping revive VH1 ratings during this time. In 2008, the company was purchased by Endemol (later Endemol Shine Group, now Banijay).

In 2010, the company branched out in Internet distributed programming, producing The Tester for the PlayStation Network. Other popular shows include Below Deck and their franchises on the NBCUniversal network, BravoTV.

References

Television production companies of the United States
Mass media companies established in 2004
American companies established in 2004
Companies based in Los Angeles
Banijay
Endemol
2008 mergers and acquisitions